Brader is a surname. Notable people with the surname include:

Alec Brader (born 1942), English footballer
Betty Brader (1923–1986), American fashion illustrator
Ferdinand A. Brader (1833–1901), American artist
Maria Josefa Karolina Brader (1860–1943), Swiss Roman Catholic religious sister